Allothrips is a genus of thrips in the family Phlaeothripidae.

Species
 Allothrips acaciae
 Allothrips acutus
 Allothrips africanus
 Allothrips aureus
 Allothrips bicolor
 Allothrips biminianus
 Allothrips bournieri
 Allothrips brasilianus
 Allothrips coanosetosus
 Allothrips discolor
 Allothrips expansus
 Allothrips greensladei
 Allothrips hamideae
 Allothrips indicus
 Allothrips magnus
 Allothrips megacephalus
 Allothrips mexicanus
 Allothrips montanus
 Allothrips nubillicauda
 Allothrips pillichellus
 Allothrips prolixus
 Allothrips stannardi
 Allothrips taiwanus
 Allothrips watsoni

References

Phlaeothripidae
Thrips
Thrips genera